is a Japanese manga series written and illustrated by Tsubasa Fukuchi. It was serialized in Shogakukan's Shōnen Sunday Super from March 2009 to January 2011. Its chapters were collected in six tankōbon volumes.

Manga 
Takkoku!!! is written and illustrated by Tsubasa Fukuchi. The series started as a one-shot in Shogakukan's Weekly Shōnen Sunday on February 27, 2008, before being serialized as a series in Shōnen Sunday Super from March 25, 2009, to January 25, 2011. The series was collected into six tankōbon volumes published by Shogakukan, from September 17, 2009, to April 18, 2011.

Volume list

References

External links 
 

Shogakukan manga
Shōnen manga
Table tennis in anime and manga